This list contains fictional chemical elements, materials, isotopes or subatomic particles that either a) play a major role in a notable work of fiction, b) are common to several unrelated works, or c) are discussed in detail by independent sources.

Fictional elements and materials

Fictional isotopes of real elements

Fictional subatomic particles

See also 

 Computronium
 Neutronium
 List of discredited substances
 List of Star Trek materials

References

External links 
Elements from DC Comics Legion of Super-heroes
Periodic Table of Comic Books – lists comic book uses of real elements
Periodic table from the BBC comedy series Look Around You.
Tarzan at the Earths Core

Elements, materials, isotopes and subatomic particles
Fictional elements, List of fictional elements, materials, isotopes and subatomic particles
 
 
Fictional elements, materials, isotopes and subatomic particles